Finney is an unincorporated community in  Barren County, Kentucky, United States.

A post office was established in the community in 1898 and named for the local Finney family.

References

Unincorporated communities in Barren County, Kentucky
Unincorporated communities in Kentucky